William George Pepper (1895 – 25 October 1918) was an English professional footballer who played in the Football League for Leicester Fosse as a goalkeeper.

Personal life 
Pepper enlisted in the Queen's Own (Royal West Kent Regiment) during the First World War. He spent time with the regiment in India before being deployed to the Middle Eastern theatre in December 1917. Pepper was serving as an acting lance corporal when he was killed in Iraq during the Battle of Sharqat on 25 October 1918. He is commemorated on the Basra Memorial.

Career statistics

References 

1895 births
People from Faversham
English footballers
Association football goalkeepers
Sheppey United F.C. players
English Football League players
British Army personnel of World War I
Queen's Own Royal West Kent Regiment soldiers
1918 deaths
Leicester City F.C. players
Military personnel from Kent
Gillingham F.C. players
Southern Football League players
British military personnel killed in World War I